Kazaz is a collection of villages and small towns that are in a short distance from Arak, Iran.

Kazaz is also a surname. Notable people with the surname:

Emil Kazaz (born 1953), American-Armenian figurative sculptor and painter
Enver Kazaz (born 1962), Bosnian literary historian, literary critic, writer, social commentator and publicist
Tuğçe Kazaz (born 1982), Turkish model, actress and Miss Turkey 2001

See also
Kazaziye, also known as Kazazlık or Kazaz, a handmade jewelry technique
Kazazi, Iran, a village in Dowlatabad Rural District, in the Central District of Ravansar County, Kermanshah Province, Iran
Kazazian, an Armenian surname made up of Kazaz and -ian